Moshav, formerly known as Moshav Band, is an Israeli-American Jewish rock band originating from Moshav Mevo Modi'im. Founded in 1995 by Yehuda Solomon and Duvid Swirsky, the group moved to Los Angeles in 2000 and has released seven studio albums. They are often regarded as one of the first groups to combine Jewish music with a rock sound, as elements of alternative rock, folk, funk, and reggae appear in their songs.

History
The Israel-born Moshav Band members grew up on Moshav Mevo Modi'im, a musical village located in the hills between Jerusalem and Tel Aviv.  Their village, founded by the late Rabbi Shlomo Carlebach, was and continues to be the birthplace of many Jewish songs enjoyed the world over. The members of the Moshav Band were under the spiritual guidance of Rabbi Shlomo Carlebach while immersed in his musical world, often performing with him at his concerts. Co-founder Yehuda Solomon is the son of Ben Zion Solomon, one of the original members of the Diaspora Yeshiva Band.

Although the members of the Moshav Band grew up playing music together, the band had its first official show at Jerusalem's Mike's Place in 1996, performing for an audience consisting mainly of American students studying abroad in various yeshivas as well as Hebrew University. The organizer of the event, Sharon Goldman, was unsure how to bill the as-yet unnamed act and opted for the simple "Moshav Band."  The name stuck.

Since that time, the band has been heard at music festivals and more intimate settings worldwide. Projects in which the Moshav Band has played an essential role include The Wake Up Tour (a Northern American Jewish Renewal project) and Israeli Block Parties, organized to increase Israel and Jewish awareness. Now based in Los Angeles, the band continues to perform throughout the US and the world. They are known for being on the soundtrack to many Nefesh B'Nefesh videos.

Members

Current members
 Yehuda Solomon — vocals, percussion
 Duvid Swirsky — vocals, guitar
 Tamir Bar Zeli — drums, percussion
 Geoffrey Parry — guitar
 Matt Cheadle — bass

Past members
 Yosef Solomon — bass
 Karen Teperberg — drums
 Meir Solomon — guitar
 Danny W. — guitar
 Oneg Shemesh — rhythm guitar, backing vocals
 Roy Kariok — guitar
 Nimrod Nol — violin

Discography

Albums
 The Things You Can't Afford (1998)
 Days (1999)
 Lost Time (2001)
 Return Again (2002)
 Live At B.B.King NYC (2003)
 Malachim (2005)
 The Best of Moshav Band: Higher and Higher (2005)
 Misplaced (2006)
 Dancing in a Dangerous World (2010)
 New Sun Rising (2014)
 Shabbat Vol. 1 (2014)
 Shabbat Vol. 2 (2018)

Singles
 2011: "Light the Way"
 2013: "Chicki Boom"
 2013: "K'Shoshana"
 2013: "World on Fire" (ft. Matisyahu)
 2021: "Rainmaker"
 2022: "Adam" (Thank You Hashem ft. Moshav)

Music videos
 "Eliyahu Hanavi" (2005)
 "Bereishit" (2005)
 "World on Fire" (2013)
 "Chicki Boom" (2014)

See also
Reva L'Sheva
Soulfarm
Hamakor (band)
Baal teshuva

References

External links
 Official Site
 Israeli Management, RNY Hafakot
 Lyrics to "Jockey Full of Bourbon" – the Moshav Band's modified version

Israeli alternative rock groups
Jewish musical groups
Shlomo Carlebach
Jewish folk rock groups
Musical groups established in 1995